"Ink" is a song by British rock band Coldplay from their sixth studio album Ghost Stories (2014). It was released as the fourth and final single from the record on 13 October in Italy's contemporary hit radio, 17 November in the United States' adult album alternative radio and 18 November in modern rock radio. The song reached number 156 on the UK Singles Chart upon the album's original release.

Music video
The animated video was designed by the production team, Blind. An interactive video of "Ink" was uploaded on Coldplay's official website. An official cut was made and uploaded on YouTube.

Synopsis
The official animated music video begins with a couple lying on a beach. The woman leaves the man on the beach and walks into the woods. The man takes a compass (which contains an image of the woman) and follows her. The man soon arrives at a fork in the trail, and takes the path to the right. He does not find her, and is then seen at a bar, contemplating his loneliness. The video continues with the man drifting along the ocean, looking at a cloud resembling the woman. The man soon arrives at a waterfall, but is saved by a large bird before falling down. He sees the woman in the clouds once again, but falls from the sky moments before trying to embrace her. Many papers surround the man and build a staircase. The man climbs up and looks at the stars through a telescope. The man sees many constellations of the couple. He then walks up to a shoreline and examines one of the constellations, which turns into one large star, and then proceeds in that direction. The man sails a boat toward the star for over a day, and soon arrives at a mega waterfall. Right before he falls off, the woman finally appears and saves him, and they float through the air, together once more.

Live performances
The band performed "Ink" during their brief and intimate Ghost Stories Tour. They also performed the song on select dates of their A Head Full of Dreams Tour, including on April 4, 2017 in Manila to fulfill the request of a cancer-stricken fan whom lead vocalist Chris Martin visited prior to the show.

Track listing

Personnel
Adapted from Ghost Stories liner notes.

Coldplay
Guy Berryman – bass guitar, keyboards
Jonny Buckland – lead guitar, slide guitar
Will Champion – drums, backing vocals
Chris Martin – lead vocals, acoustic guitar

Technical personnel
Paul Epworth – production
Rik Simpson – production
Daniel Green – production

Charts and certifications

Weekly charts

Certifications

Release history

References

External links

official interactive video

2014 songs
2014 singles
Parlophone singles
Coldplay songs
Songs written by Chris Martin
Songs written by Jonny Buckland
Songs written by Guy Berryman
Songs written by Will Champion
Song recordings produced by Paul Epworth
Song recordings produced by Rik Simpson
Animated music videos